AC/DC for General Exhibition, released only in Australia in 1989, is a video album by Australian hard rock band AC/DC. In March 2005, all nine tracks were issued on the DVD compilation Family Jewels.

Track listing 
All tracks written by Malcolm Young, Angus Young and Bon Scott.
"High Voltage"
"Jailbreak"
"Let There Be Rock"
"Riff Raff"
"Dog Eat Dog"
"Highway to Hell"
"Shot Down in Flames"
"Touch Too Much"
"If You Want Blood (You've Got It)"

Personnel 
Bon Scott – lead vocals
Angus Young – lead guitar
Malcolm Young – rhythm guitar, backing vocals
George Young – bass guitar on track 1
Cliff Williams – bass guitar and backing vocals on tracks 6–9
Phil Rudd – drums, percussion
Mark Evans – bass guitar  on tracks 2–4

Certifications

References

1989 video albums
AC/DC video albums